The Oakes National Bank Block on Main Avenue in Oakes, North Dakota was built in 1908.  It was listed on the National Register of Historic Places in 1987.

The site is located in Oakes' central business district with retail businesses on the ground floor and office/residential space on the second floor.  Its listing on the National Register was based on the structure's outstanding quality of design and its contribution to the city's commercial development.

References

Commercial buildings on the National Register of Historic Places in North Dakota
Romanesque Revival architecture in North Dakota
Commercial buildings completed in 1908
National Register of Historic Places in Dickey County, North Dakota
1908 establishments in North Dakota